US Bank Centre is a , 44-story skyscraper in Seattle, in the U.S. state of Washington. It opened as Pacific First Center and was constructed from 1987 to 1989. It is currently the eighth-tallest building in Seattle and was designed by Callison Architecture, who is also headquartered in the building. It contains  of office space.

Art collection
The public shopping area in the building's lower levels has a permanent collection of works by noted artists, funded by 1% set-aside of the construction costs. The collection includes Flower Form 2 by Dale Chihuly.

See also
List of tallest buildings in Seattle

References

Office buildings completed in 1989
Office buildings in Seattle
Skyscraper office buildings in Seattle
U.S. Bank buildings
Bank buildings in Washington (state)
Ivanhoé Cambridge
1989 establishments in Washington (state)